Charles Cros or Émile-Hortensius-Charles Cros (October 1, 1842 – August 9, 1888) was a French poet and inventor.  He was born in Fabrezan, Aude.

Cros was a well-regarded poet and humorous writer. As an inventor, he was interested in the fields of transmitting graphics by telegraph and making photographs in color, but he is perhaps best known for being the first person to conceive a method for reproducing recorded sound, an invention he named the Paleophone.

Charles Cros died in Paris at the age of 45.

Early life and education
Cros was born to the philosopher Simon Charles Henry Cros (1803–1876) and Josephine Thor. He was the grandson of grammarian Antoine Cros (1769–1844).
Cros was the brother of and the painter and sculptor Henry Cros (:fr: Henry Cros) (1840–1907) and of Antoine-Hippolyte Cros (1833-1903), a surgeon who was also pretender to the throne of the defunct Kingdom of Araucanía and Patagonia from March 6, 1902 until November 1, 1903, and the uncle of Laure-Therese Cros (1856-1916), who was the Queen of Araucania and Patagonia from November 1, 1903 until February 12, 1916.

In 1860 Cros began studies in medicine, but he soon abandoned them for a life of literary and scientific pursuits.

Inventions

Photography
Cros almost invented colour photography. In 1869 he published a theory of color photography in which he proposed that a single scene could be photographed through glass filters colored green, violet, and orange. The three negatives obtained through those filters could be developed to produce positive impressions that contained varying amounts of red, yellow, and blue (the "antichromatic" or complementary colors of the filters). The three positive impressions, when superimposed on one another (for instance, by making three carbon prints using sufficiently transparent pigments, then transferring the pigmented gelatin onto a single support sheet) would recompose the original colors of the photographed scene. Cros's proposals, which anticipated the subtractive method of modern photography, were similar to more influential ideas advanced about the same time by Louis Ducos du Hauron. The same day, May 7, 1869, Charles Cros and Louis Ducos du Hauron presented their method of creating color photographs to the French Society of Photography. They had not been in communication beforehand and each knew nothing about the other's research. Cros ended up conceding the invention to Ducos Du Hauron, despite having deposited a sealed paper at the French Academy of Sciences on December 2, 1867. Ducos du Hauron had patented his ideas on November 28, 1868, almost a full year later, but claimed to have written an unpublished paper on the subject in 1862.

Phonograph
Cros almost invented the phonograph. As far as is known, no one before him had thought of a practical way to reproduce sound from a recording of airborne sound waves. He gave the Greek name 'Paleophone' ('voix du passé', tr. 'voice of the past') to his invention. On April 30, 1877 he submitted a sealed envelope containing a letter to the Academy of Sciences in Paris explaining his proposed method. The letter stated in French, "Un index léger est solidaire du centre de figure d'une membrane vibrante ; il se termine par une pointe [...] qui repose sur une surface noircie à la flamme." The English translation is one close to this: "A lightweight armature is fixed to the center of the face of a vibrating membrane; it ends with a sharp point [...] which rests on a lamp-blacked surface." This surface is integral with a disc driven by a double movement of rotation and linear progression. The system is reversible: when the tip follows the furrow the membrane restores the original acoustic signal. The letter was read in public on December 3 following. In his letter, after having shown that his method consisted of detecting an oscillation of a membrane and using the tracing to reproduce the oscillation with respect to its duration and intensity, Cros added that a cylindrical form for the receiving apparatus seemed to him to be the most practical, as it allowed for the graphic inscription of the vibrations by means of a very fine-threaded screw. An article on the Paleophone was published in "la semaine du Clergé" on October 10, 1877, written by l'Abbé Leblanc. Cros proposed metal for both engraving tool attached to the diaphragm and receiving material for durability.

Before Cros had a chance to follow up on this idea or attempt to construct a working model, Thomas Alva Edison introduced his first working phonograph in the US. Edison used a cylinder covered in tinfoil for his first phonograph, patenting this method for reproducing sound on January 15, 1878. Edison and Cros apparently did not know of each other's work in advance.

Martian communication mirror
Cros was convinced that pinpoints of light observed on Mars and Venus, probably high clouds illuminated by the sun, were the lights of large cities on those planets.  He spent years petitioning the French government to build a giant mirror that could be used to communicate with the Martians and Venusians by burning giant lines on the deserts of those planets.  He was never convinced that the Martians were not a proven fact, nor that the mirror he wanted was technically impossible to build.

Poetry

In the early 1870s Cros was published in the short-lived weekly Renaissance littéraire et artistique, edited by Emile Blémont (:fr: Émile Blémont). Other contributors included Stéphane Mallarmé, Auguste Villiers de l'Isle-Adam and Paul Verlaine .

His poem The Kippered Herring inspired Ernest Coquelin to create what he called monologues, short theatrical pieces whose format was copied by numerous imitators. The piece, translated as The Salt Herring, was translated and illustrated by Edward Gorey.

Bibliography

Non-fiction
 Solution générale du problème de la photographie des couleurs (1869)

Poetry
 Le Coffret de santal (1873 and 1879)
 Plainte (1873)
 Le Fleuve (1874)
 La Vision du Grand Canal des Deux Mers (1888)
 Le Collier de griffes (posthumous, 1908)

English translations published in the United States
Charles Cros: Collected Monologues Translated by Doug Skinner (Black Scat Books, 2018)
Upside-Down Stories Translated by Doug Skinner (Black Scat Books, 2019)

Miscellaneous
The Académie Charles Cros, the French equivalent of the US Recording Academy, is named in his honor.

Cros was a member of the group known as the hydropathes which existed around the period 1878–1881. Charles Cros, played by Christopher Chaplin, appears in the film Total Eclipse, about the lives of Paul Verlaine and Arthur Rimbaud. Cros is seen for a few seconds at the Le Chat Noir in Paris, a café which opened in 1881 and had become the home for the avant-garde art scene of the time.

Marie Corelli published one of his poems posthumously in the text of her 1890s' book, Wormwood, with a special note of respect to the recently deceased author.

Cros had a love affair from 1867-1877 with Nina de Callias.

See also

L'Académie Charles Cros
Zutiste

References

External links

 
 
 Charles Cros' letter describing his phonograph

19th-century French inventors
Pioneers of photography
French humorists
1842 births
1888 deaths
Burials at Montparnasse Cemetery
French male poets
19th-century French poets